Marija Veger Demšar (Serbian Cyrillic: Марија Вегер Демшар; born December 26, 1947, in Novi Sad, SFR Yugoslavia) is a Serbian and Yugoslavian former female basketball player.

Personal life 
Veger was married to Ladislav Demšar (1929–1992), Yugoslav basketball player and coach.

External links
Biography

1947 births
Living people
Basketball players from Novi Sad
Serbian women's basketball players
Yugoslav women's basketball players
ŽKK Vojvodina players
Serbian expatriate basketball people in Italy